Ulrich Marten (born 7 January 1956) is a former professional tennis player from West Germany.

Career
Marten was a doubles quarterfinalist at the 1976 Australian Open, with partner Rolf Gehring.

In 1977 he had wins over both Robin Drysdale and American Mark Meyers to make the round of 16 at the South Australian Men's Tennis Classic.

He came from two sets down to defeat Cliff Letcher at the 1979 Australian Open, 8–6 in the fifth. It was one of five times that he would make the second round of a Grand Slam singles draw, but he was unable to go further.

Marten made an appearance in 1979 for the West Germany Davis Cup team, in a tie against Romania. He featured in the doubles rubber, with Jürgen Fassbender, which they lost, to Gavorielle-Traian Marcu and Ilie Năstase.

In 1980 he reached the singles quarter-finals at the Stuttgart Outdoor tournament, beating Patrice Dominguez and Ulrich Pinner.

Grand Prix career finals

Doubles: 1 (1–0)

Challenger titles

Doubles: (1)

References

External links
 
 
 

1956 births
Living people
West German male tennis players
People from Schweinfurt (district)
Sportspeople from Lower Franconia
Tennis people from Bavaria